Cinnamomea, cinnamomeus, or cinnamomeum is a New Latin adjective meaning cinnamon-colored that occurs in the species names of many organisms. It may refer to:

Birds
 Anthus cinnamomeus, the African pipit 
 Attila cinnamomeus, the cinnamon attila 
 Bradypterus cinnamomeus, the cinnamon bracken warbler 
 Certhiaxis cinnamomeus, the yellow-chinned spinetail 
 Cinclosoma cinnamomeum, the cinnamon quail-thrush
 Cisticola cinnamomeus, the pale-crowned cisticola 
 Crypturellus cinnamomeus, the thicket tinamou or rufescent tinamou 
 Hypocryptadius cinnamomeus, the cinnamon ibon 
 Ixobrychus cinnamomeus, the cinnamon bittern or chestnut bittern 
Pachyramphus cinnamomeus, the cinnamon becard
 Pericrocotus cinnamomeus, the small minivet 
 Picumnus cinnamomeus, the chestnut piculet 
 Pyrrhomyias cinnamomeus, the cinnamon flycatcher 
Passer cinnamomeus, the russet sparrow

Fungi 

 Microglossum cinnamomeum
 Physocystidium cinnamomeum
 Trichoderma cinnamomeum

Insects
 Copelatus cinnamomeus, a diving beetle
 Eublemma cinnamomeum, a moth
 Heteragrion cinnamomeum, a dragonfly
 Hoplogrammicosum cinnamomeum, a beetle
 Marasmarcha cinnamomeus, a moth
 Orthomegas cinnamomeus, a beetle

Plants
 Odontoglossum cinnamomeum, an orchid
 Oncidium cinnamomeum, an orchid
 Osmundastrum cinnamomeum, a fern
 Rhododendron arboreum subsp. cinnamomeum, a flowering shrub
 Solanum cinnamomeum, a tomato species

See also 
 Cinnamomum